|}

The Prix de la Porte Maillot is a Group 3 flat horse race in France open to thoroughbreds aged three years or older. It is run at Longchamp over a distance of 1,400 metres (about 7 furlongs), and it is scheduled to take place each year in late June or early July.

History
The event is named after the Porte Maillot, a gateway to the Bois de Boulogne. It has been staged since 1867, although in its earlier years it was a minor race.

The profile of the Prix de la Porte Maillot was raised when it became part of the prestigious Grand Prix de Paris meeting in 1952. From this point it was contested over 1,600 metres, and it was shortened to 1,400 metres in 1955.

The race has continued to be held at Longchamp without exception, but it is no longer run on the same day as the Grand Prix de Paris.

Records
Most successful horse (2 wins):
 Marchand d'Or – 2006, 2007
 Moonlight Cloud – 2011, 2013

Leading jockey (4 wins):
 Freddy Head – Dedini (1967), African Joy (1983), Vilikaia (1985), Funambule (1990)

Leading trainer (7 wins):
 Freddy Head – Charming Groom (2004), Marchand d'Or (2006), Marchand d'Or (2007), Moonlight Cloud (2011), Moonlight Cloud (2013), Efaadah (2018), Polydream (2019)

Leading owner (3 wins):
 Guy de Rothschild – Guersant (1952), Cobalt (1953), Soleil (1966)
 Hamdan Al Maktoum – Joanna (2010), Mashoora (2012), Efaadah (2018)
 Godolphin – Josr Algarhoud (2000), Inns of Court (2017), Space Blues (2020)

Winners since 1979

 The 2016 & 2017 races took place at Deauville while Longchamp was closed for redevelopment.

Earlier winners

 1952: Guersant
 1953: Cobalt
 1954: Falstaff
 1955: Americ
 1956: Verrieres
 1957: Balbo
 1958: Shut Up
 1959: Radjah
 1960: Debut
 1961: Tertullien
 1962: Prince Altana
 1963: Linacre
 1964: Kirkland Lake
 1965: The Marshal
 1966: Soleil
 1967: Dedini
 1968: Rosetta
 1969: Democratie
 1970: Great Heron
 1971: Faraway Son
 1972: Sallust
 1973: Boldboy
 1974: El Rastro
 1975: Hamada
 1976: Son of Silver
 1977: Polyponder
 1978: Faraway Times

See also
 List of French flat horse races

References
 France Galop / Racing Post:
 france-galop.com – A Brief History: Prix de la Porte Maillot.
 galop.courses-france.com – Prix de la Porte Maillot – Palmarès depuis 1980.
 galopp-sieger.de – Prix de la Porte Maillot.
 horseracingintfed.com – International Federation of Horseracing Authorities – Prix de la Porte Maillot (2016).
 pedigreequery.com – Prix de la Porte Maillot – Longchamp.

Open mile category horse races
Longchamp Racecourse
Horse races in France
Recurring sporting events established in 1867